A total of 542 athletes will compete in the cycling competitions at the 2019 European Games; 226 in road cycling and 316 in track cycling. Quota places for the road cycling events are based on the UCI World Rankings at 31 December 2018, while the quota places for the track cycling events are based on the UCI ranking after the 2019 UCI Track Cycling World Championships.

Road cycling

Men's road race

Women's road race

Men's time trial

Women's time trial

Track cycling

Team sprint
Teams must be composed of 3 riders for the men's event and 2 riders for the women's event.

Sprint

Keirin

1km/500m time trial

Team pursuit

Individual pursuit

Scratch race

Points race

Omnium

Madison

References

Qualification
Qualification for the 2019 European Games